= Sohawa Mirza =

- Town
- Location within Pakistan
- Coordinates: 33.18°N 73.27°E
- Country: Pakistan
- Province: (Islamabad Capital Territory) Islamabad C.T
- Elevation: 443 m (1,453 ft)
- Time zone: UTC+5 (PST)

Sohawa Mirza is a town in the Islamabad Capital Territory of Pakistan. It is located at 33° 18' 35N 73° 27' 30E at an altitude of 443 metres (1456 feet).
